"Down in It" is the debut single by American industrial rock band Nine Inch Nails, released on September 15, 1989. Taken from the band's debut album Pretty Hate Machine, it was the first song ever written by frontman Trent Reznor.

Production
The song's outro contains lyrics referencing the nursery rhyme "Rain Rain Go Away". In 2010, Reznor admitted that the song was his attempt to make a rip-off of the Skinny Puppy song "Dig It" from the 1986 album Mind: The Perpetual Intercourse.

Release
Initially released only on vinyl, a CD version of the single was later created after the success of the album. The first track on the single edition, "Down in It (Skin)", is the mix found on Pretty Hate Machine. The cover art is very similar to Joy Division's first album Unknown Pleasures, with Joy Division always being cited as an influence by Reznor, and Nine Inch Nails later covered the Joy Division song "Dead Souls" on the soundtrack to the 1994 film The Crow.

Promotion
Around the time of the single's release, the band lip-synced a performance of the song on the dance music show Dance Party USA. The footage, originally thought to be lost, was rediscovered in 2012 and went viral after being uploaded to YouTube. Reznor responded to the video on his Twitter account, stating that the band had decided to appear on the show after deciding it was "the most absurd choice [they] could come up with at the time" for a television program on which they would be interested in performing, but were surprised when they were actually booked to appear on the program.

Releases
TVT Records TVT 2611 – 12" Vinyl
TVT Records TVT 2611-2 – CD

The single was included in the 2015 Record Store Day–Black Friday exclusive box set Halo I–IV.

Music video
A music video for "Down in It" directed by Eric Zimmerman and Benjamin Stokes, filmed on location in the Warehouse District of Chicago, was released in September 1989. It includes special effects applied to scenes such as a television set falling down forwards and backwards, writing in lights, and strobe flashing. In the video, Reznor runs to the top of a building while Chris Vrenna and Richard Patrick follow him. The original version of the music video ended with the implication that Reznor's character had fallen off the building and died, an effect achieved by covering him in corn starch made to look like injuries. MTV edited the scene out of all airings. To film the ending of the video, Zimmerman and Stokes used a camera tied to a balloon, with ropes attached to prevent it from flying away. Minutes after they started filming, the ropes snapped and the balloons and camera flew away; after traveling over 200 miles, the contraption landed on a farmer's field in Michigan. The farmer later handed it to the FBI, who began investigating whether the footage was a snuff film portraying a person committing suicide. The FBI identified Reznor, who later remarked, "Somebody at the FBI had been watching too much Hitchcock or David Lynch or something." 

Reznor stated the following in an interview with Convulsion Magazine:There was a scene w[h]ere I was lying on the ground, appearing to be dead, in a Lodger-esque pose and we had a camera with a big weather balloon filled with helium hooked up to it ... the first one we did, we started the film, I was laying [sic] on the ground and the ropes that were holding the balloon snapped, the camera just took off into the atmosphere ... the camera landed two hundred miles away in a farmer's field somewhere. He finds it and takes it to the police, thinking that it's a surveillance camera for marijuana, they develop the film and think that it's some sort of snuff film of a murder, give it to the FBI and have pathologists looking at the body saying, 'yeah, he's rotting,' (I had corn starch on me, right) 'he's been decomposing for 3 weeks.' You could see the other members of the band walking away and they had these weird outfits on, and they thought it was some kind of gang slaying.

The investigation ended when Reznor's manager demonstrated that Reznor was alive and the footage was not related to crime or satanism. This story was covered by the news magazine show Hard Copy on their March 3, 1991 episode. Reznor did not enjoy the show and said, "Total junk gossip exploitative journalism. That was the icing on the cake: getting on the worst TV show in America."

Critical reception
The single edition of the song was largely panned by Allmusic, who described the two remixes included as inferior to the original. Since all three tracks were later released on the "Head Like a Hole" single, Allmusic labeled the "Down in It" single as "completely superfluous and useful only to NIN completists".

Covers, soundtrack appearances and legacy
"Down in It" has been covered by Eric Gorfain, The Meeks, Dead When I Found Her, Sasha, and Tiga.

A remix of "Down in It" was used in an early 1990s Gatorade television advertisement. Originally, "Steppin' Out" by Joe Jackson was to be featured in the commercial, but Jackson declined the offer. Reznor unsuccessfully sued the production company who created the commercial for copyright infringement after he saw it in 1993, accusing them for illegal use of the song without permission.

The song's lyrics share similarities with those of the 2005 Nine Inch Nails song "Only", from the album With Teeth. The opening verse of Down in It contains the lyric "Just then a tiny little dot caught my eye," while the second verse of Only opens with the lyric "Well, the tiniest little dot caught my eye." In "Only", Trent elaborates on what that dot was ("a scab trying to seal itself shut"), while both songs also include several references to personal growth and change: "fading away" from the kind of person the protagonist once assumed himself to be and an uncertainty as to who they will inevitably become.

Track listing
All tracks remixed by Adrian Sherwood and Keith LeBlanc.

Year-end charts

References

Bibliography

External links
Nine Inch Nails' official site
 
Halo 1 at NINCollector.com

1989 debut singles
Nine Inch Nails songs
Song recordings produced by Keith LeBlanc
Song recordings produced by Adrian Sherwood
Songs written by Trent Reznor
TVT Records singles
Fiction about snuff films
1989 songs
American hip hop songs
Rap rock songs